Kevin C. Abrams (born August 1971) is a Canadian-born American football executive who is currently the senior vice president of football operations & strategy  of the New York Giants of the National Football League. Abrams worked as the Interim General Manager during the 2017 NFL season following the firing of his boss Jerry Reese.

Career

Early career
Abrams began his career working as an intern for Ohio University football program, the Buffalo Bills, the Washington Redskins, and the London Monarchs.

NFL
Abrams began his career in the NFL working for the NFL Management Council as a salary cap analyst analyzing NFL player contracts.

In July 1999, following his work with the NFL Management Council, Abrams was hired by the New York Giants as a salary cap analyst, a newly created position by the team. In 2002 Abrams was promoted to Assistant General Manager working under GM Ernie Accorsi.
During the 2017 NFL season, Abrams worked as the Interim General Manager due to the firing of his boss, GM Jerry Reese. Abrams was interviewed for the Giants GM position, however, he was beat out by former Carolina Panthers General Manager and former longtime Giants employee, Dave Gettleman.

On February 5, 2022, Abrams was named senior vice president of football operations and strategy for the New York Giants.

Personal life
Abrams currently lives in Manhattan with his wife, Sarah-Jane, and three kids, Cormac, Grace, and Joseph.

References

External links
 New York Giants profile

New York Giants executives
Sportspeople from Toronto
Living people
National Football League general managers
1971 births
University of Western Ontario alumni